The King John School, often abbreviated to King John, is a secondary academy school with a sixth form in South Benfleet, Essex, England. It is named after King John of England (1166–1216). The main school building was opened in 1949: contrary to popular belief this building was never designed, nor used, as a hospital. As of October 2020, the school has an enrolment of 2128 students, operating over its recommended capacity of 2000 students.

History 
Construction of the school was started in 1938, but suspended for the duration of the war and restarted in 1948. It was opened in May 1949 as Benfleet Secondary Modern, at which time only the South Wing was completed. The school took pupils from primary schools in Hadleigh, Thundersley, South Benfleet and New Thundersley. Before the official opening in 1953, the school was used as a shelter station after the Canvey Island flood tragedy, a gesture that led to the headmaster being awarded the OBE.  It was then known as King John Secondary modern school with 1100 pupils and became a comprehensive school in the early 1960s, it is now a secondary academy school with a sixth form. 

Wilko Johnson, the guitarist in Dr. Feelgood (band) and Ian Dury and The Blockheads, then addressed as Mr. Wilkinson, briefly taught English in 1973.

References

External links 
 Essex BSF Schools

Academies in Essex
Educational institutions established in 1949
Secondary schools in Essex
1949 establishments in England